Andrew Katsulas (May 18, 1946February 13, 2006), known professionally as Andreas Katsulas, was an American film and television actor, most recognized for portrayals of Narn Ambassador G'Kar on the American science fiction television series Babylon 5.

Life and career
Born in St. Louis, Missouri, to a working-class Greek American family, Katsulas earned a master's degree in theatre from Indiana University. He started an acting career that took him from South American barrios to Lincoln Center. From 1971 to 1986, he toured with Peter Brook's International Theatre Company, performing improvisational and prepared theater pieces. In 1981 and 1982, he appeared on the CBS daytime drama (soap opera) Guiding Light as Lucien Goff.

Katsulas appeared in various films, including The Sicilian, Next of Kin, Someone to Watch Over Me, Sunset, Hot Shots! Part Deux, and Executive Decision. He played the one-armed villain Fredrick Sykes in The Fugitive (1993).

Katsulas was a regular on the television series Babylon 5 (1994–1998), where he portrayed Ambassador G'Kar. He played the Romulan Commander Tomalak on Star Trek: The Next Generation.

A lifelong smoker, Katsulas died of lung cancer on February 13, 2006, at the age of 59. He was survived by his wife, Gilla Nissan Katsulas, and his two children from a previous marriage, Michael and Katherine.

Filmography

Film

Television

Video games

References

External links

 
 
 
 
 

American male film actors
American male stage actors
American male television actors
American male voice actors
American people of Greek descent
Indiana University alumni
Male actors from St. Louis
Deaths from lung cancer in California
Saint Louis University alumni
1946 births
2006 deaths
20th-century American male actors
21st-century American male actors